Sunridge Mall is a major enclosed shopping mall in Calgary, Alberta containing 830,599 square feet / 77,165 m² of retail space. It is in the city's northeast quadrant, located at the corner of 36 Street NE and 20 Avenue NE, adjacent to the Rundle LRT station, sunridge Spectrum Movie Theatre, and the Peter Lougheed Centre. Sunridge Mall is owned and operated by Primaris Management Inc, a division of H&R REIT.

Originally opened in October 1981, Sunridge Mall completed a $50 million renovation and expansion program.

See also

 List of shopping malls in Canada

References

External links
Official website

Shopping malls in Calgary
Shopping malls established in 1981
1981 establishments in Alberta